Conestee is an unincorporated community and census-designated place (CDP) in Greenville County, South Carolina, United States. It was first listed as a CDP in the 2020 census with a population of 904.

Conestee's main attraction is Lake Conestee Nature Park. The community is bordered by the city of Greenville to the north, Mauldin to the east and Gantt to the west.

Conestee Mill and McBee Methodist Church are listed on the National Register of Historic Places and located in Conestee.

Demographics

2020 census

Note: the US Census treats Hispanic/Latino as an ethnic category. This table excludes Latinos from the racial categories and assigns them to a separate category. Hispanics/Latinos can be of any race.

References

Unincorporated communities in Greenville County, South Carolina
Unincorporated communities in South Carolina
Census-designated places in Greenville County, South Carolina
Census-designated places in South Carolina